Maurha is a village and a Gram panchayat in Ballia district in the Indian state of Uttar Pradesh. Its population is 555, per the 2011 Census. Maurha's nearest railway station is Belthara Road. During British India it was a Taluqdari

Maurha has an ancient temple of Lord Shiva on its outskirts, which is believed to have been constructed in the 16th century AD.

Founder of Maurha Taluqdari was Raja Mohar Singh. He was a Rajput of Chandravanshi (Somavanshi) dynasty. Raja Mohar Singh was the Raja of Maurha from 1894 until 1923.

There he built a Bhawan and called it Mohar Bhawan after himself. Subsequently, the area around the Bhawan became known as Maurha.

Titular

Titular Taluqdar of Maurha is Mamta Singh Kshatriya.

References

External links 
 Maurh (Taluk) Homepage with Pictures and Map

Cities and towns in Ballia district
History of Uttar Pradesh
Zamindari estates